The 2015 Pan American Surf Games, also referred to as PASA Games 2015 and officially named XI Pan American Surfing Games Claro Open 2015 for sponsorship reasons, was the eleventh edition of the Pan American Surf Games, the main competition organized by the Pan American Surf Association. It was held at Punta Rocas beach in Punta Negra District, Lima, Peru from 2 to 6 December 2015.

Athletes from 11 national teams competes in 13 surfing events; comprising Open (Shortboard), SUP surf, SUP race, Bodyboard prone and Paddleboard race each for men and women, plus Longboard, Bodyboard dropknee and Juniors Under–20 (shortboard) events only for men.

Peru won the competition with 11 out of the 13 gold medals at stake. Chile, Ecuador and Venezuela were second, third and fourth respectively.

Schedule
The games were held over a 5-day period, from 2 to 6 December.

Participating nations
10 out of the 26 national associations affiliated to Pan American Surf Association, in addition to Bolivia, entered the competition.

Medal table

Results

Men's events

Women's events

Final ranking per teams
The final ranking per teams was drawn up by adding the individual points earning by the best four surfers in the men's Open event, the best two surfers in the women's Open event and the best surfer in the remaining 11 events. Surfers obtained points according to the final position they occupied in each event.

Non-initiators and non-finishers surfers received zero points. Points awarded according to the position were as follows:

The first place of the final ranking per teams was declared as the champion team of the 2016 Pan American Surf Games.

References

Pan American Surf Games